WXTN (1000 AM) is an American radio station licensed to serve Benton, Mississippi, United States. The station, established in 1959, is owned by Holmes County Broadcasting Company, LLC. Former owner Brad Cothran died in a one-car traffic collision on May 30, 2009, and the station's license was transferred to Holmes County Broadcasting effective June 29, 2012.

The station is an AM daytimer, limited to daylight-only broadcast operations to protect the nighttime signals of KOMO in Seattle, Washington, WMVP in Chicago, Illinois, and XEOY in Mexico City.  The station was assigned the call sign "WXTN" by the Federal Communications Commission (FCC).

WXTN broadcasts a religious radio format.

References

External links

Radio stations established in 1959
Holmes County, Mississippi
XTN
1959 establishments in Mississippi
XTN